Kaguya-sama: Love Is War is a 2019 Japanese anime series, based on the manga series of the same title, written and illustrated by Aka Akasaka. The anime television series adaptation was announced by Shueisha on June 1, 2018. The series was directed by Mamoru Hatakeyama and written by Yasuhiro Nakanishi, with animation by A-1 Pictures. Yuuko Yahiro provided the character designs, while Jin Aketagawa served the sound director and Kei Haneoka composed the series' music. The series premiered from January 12 to March 30, 2019, broadcasting on MBS, Tokyo MX, BS11, GTV, GYT, CTV, and TeNY. The series ran for 12 episodes. Masayuki Suzuki, Rikka Ihara, and Yoshiki Mizuno performs the series' opening song "Love Dramatic feat. Rikka Ihara", while Halca performs the series' ending theme song "Sentimental Crisis."

Aniplex of America have acquired the series in North America, and streamed the series on Crunchyroll, Hulu, and Funimation. In Australia and New Zealand, AnimeLab simulcasted the series within the region.


Episode list

References

Kaguya-sama: Love Is War episode lists
2019 Japanese television seasons